During the 1995–96 English football season, Millwall F.C. competed in the Football League First Division, the second tier of English football.

Season summary
The season started brightly for Millwall, as the Lions went top of the First Division from almost the start of the season and stayed in the automatic promotion places for the first third of the season. Despite three straight losses, Millwall were still top of an admittedly tight First Division as December arrived. However, manager Mick McCarthy left to manage Ireland after a 6–0 defeat at Sunderland saw Millwall lose top spot; under his successor, Jimmy Nicholl, Millwall went into freefall with only four more wins all season. A draw on the last day of the season condemned the Lions to relegation.

Final league table

Squad
Squad at end of season

Left club during season

Transfers

In
  Mickey Bennett –  Charlton Athletic, July
  Bobby Bowry –  Crystal Palace, July
  Lucas Neill –  Australian Institute of Sport, July
  Anton Rogan –  Oxford United, August
  Nick Colgan –  Chelsea, September, loan
  Vasili Kulkov –  Spartak Moscow, January, loan
  Tim Carter –  Oxford United, January
  Mickey Weir –  Hibernian, January, loan
  Sergei Yuran –  Spartak Moscow, January

Out
  Roger Joseph –  Wimbledon, June
  John Kerr –  Walsall, June, loan
  Dave Mitchell –  Selangor, June
  Andy Roberts –  Crystal Palace, July
  David Oldfield –  Luton Town, July
  Alistair Edwards –  Sydney Olympic, January

Results

First Division

 23 September: Millwall 1–2 Sunderland (Scott pen., Smith); attendance 8,691
 1 October: Derby County 2–2 Millwall (Willems, van der Lann; ?); attendance 9,590
 22 October: Crystal Palace 1–2 Millwall (Gordon; ?); attendance 14,338
 28 October: Millwall 2–1 West Bromwich Albion (?; Hunt); attendance 9,717
 18 November: Millwall 0–0 Huddersfield Town; attendance 9,402
 9 December: Sunderland 6–0 Millwall (Russell 4, Scott pen., P Gray); attendance 18,951
 16 December: Millwall 0–1 Derby County (Sturridge); attendance 7,694
 26 December: Wolverhampton Wanderers 1–1 Millwall (Bull; ?); attendance 25,591
 4 November: Birmingham City 2–2 Millwall (Castle, Charlery; Dixon, Rae); attendance 23,016
 27 January: Millwall 1–1 Portsmouth (Burton); attendance 7,710

 2 March: Millwall 0–1 Wolverhampton Wanderers (Bull); attendance 9,13
 30 March: Millwall 1–4 Crystal Palace (Hopkin, Brown, Ndah 2); attendance 13,214
 6 April: West Bromwich Albion 1–0 Millwall (Sneekes); attendance 13,793
 10 April: Millwall 2–0 Birmingham City (?); attendance 9,271
 13 April: Huddersfield Town 3–0 Millwall (Jepson pen., Edwards, Booth); attendance 11,206

References

Millwall F.C. seasons
Millwall